An atypical antidepressant is any antidepressant medication that acts in a manner that is different from that of most other antidepressants. Atypical antidepressants include agomelatine, bupropion, iprindole, mianserin, mirtazapine, nefazodone, opipramol, tianeptine, and trazodone. The agents vilazodone and vortioxetine are partly atypical. Typical antidepressants include the SSRI's, SNRI's, TCA's, and MAOI's, which act mainly by increasing the levels of the monoamine neurotransmitters serotonin and/or norepinephrine. Among TCAs, trimipramine is an atypical agent in that it appears not to do this.  In August 2020, Esketamine (JNJ-54135419) was approved by the U.S. Food and Drug Administration (FDA) for the treatment for treatment-resistant depression with the added indication for the short-term treatment of suicidal thoughts.

Buprenorphine/samidorphan (ALKS-5461) is an antidepressant with a novel mechanism of action which was formerly under development and considered an atypical antidepressant. They act faster than available antidepressants.

See also
 Second-generation antidepressant
 Pharmacology of antidepressants
 List of antidepressants

References

Antidepressants